Route nationale 33 (RN 33) is a secondary highway in Madagascar from Morarano Chrome to Andriamena. It crosses the regions of Alaotra-Mangoro and Betsiboka Region.

Selected locations on route
(east to west)
Morarano Chrome  (junction with RN 3a)
Ambakireny 
Brieville (84 km)
Andriamena 

Only the part between  Morarano Chrome and Brieville is paved.

See also
List of roads in Madagascar
Transport in Madagascar

References

Roads in Alaotra-Mangoro
Roads in Betsiboka
Roads in Madagascar